Syed Kazim Ali Shah (born 5 December 1969) is a Pakistani politician who had been a member of the National Assembly of Pakistan, from June 2013 to May 2018.

Early life
He was born on 5 December 1969.

Political career
He ran for the seat of the National Assembly of Pakistan as a candidate of Pakistan Muslim League (F) (PML-F) from Constituency NA-217 (Khairpur-III) in 2008 Pakistani general election but was unsuccessful. He received 51,183 votes and lost the seat to Fazal Ali Shah.

He was elected to the National Assembly as a candidate of PML-F from Constituency NA-217 (Khairpur-III) in 2013 Pakistani general election. He received 75,862 votes and defeated Syed Javed Ali Shah Jillani.

References

Living people
Sindhi people
Pakistani MNAs 2013–2018
People from Sindh
1969 births